James Sanders may refer to:

Sports
 James Sanders (American football) (born 1983), American football safety
 Twiggy Sanders (James Sanders), member of the Harlem Globetrotters
 Jimmy Sanders (footballer) (1920–2003), English footballer
 Jimmy Sanders (baseball) (1902–1975), minor league baseball player and manager
 Jim Sanders (rugby league) (1900–1981), New Zealand international

Politicians
 James Sanders Jr. (born 1957), New York State Senator, 2013-
 James Sanders Holman (1804–1867), first mayor of Houston, Texas

Others
 James Sanders (architect) (born 1955), architect, designer, and writer in New York City
 James A. Sanders (1927–2020), Biblical scholar
 James C. Sanders (1926–2018), American businessman and administrator of the Small Business Administration
 Murder of James Sanders, murdered while showing a diamond ring that was listed for sale in Craigslist
 Speed Demon (comics), also known as James Sanders, a Marvel Comics character